Donald Patrick Harvey II (born May 31, 1960) is an American actor.

Early life
Harvey was born and raised in St. Clair Shores, Michigan, the sixth of eight children. He started acting while attending Lake Shore High School, having performed in several shows before graduating in 1978. He then moved on to the University of Michigan, where he studied English and economics along with two years of classical ballet. Upon his 1982 graduation from the University of Michigan with a Bachelor of Arts degree, he attended the Yale School of Drama and received a Master of Fine Arts degree in acting in 1985. After graduation, he moved to New York City to pursue film, television and theatre work.

Career
Harvey began appearing in films in the late 1980s and has appeared in over 70 feature films. One of his first roles was as a dirty cop in Brian de Palma's film The Untouchables. The following year, Harvey had one of his more prominent screen roles as "Black Sox" conspirator Swede Risberg in John Sayles' Eight Men Out (1988). Subsequently, Harvey had secondary roles in such high-profile productions as Casualties of War (1989) (his second Brian de Palma film), Die Hard 2 (1990), and The Thin Red Line (1998), in addition to the made-for-cable feature Better Off Dead (1993). His television work includes performances on Miami Vice, NYPD Blue, The Pretender, The Deuce, Medium, Numbers, and We Own This City.

Filmography

Film

Television

References

External links
 
 Don Harvey Official website
 Article on General Hospital role
 Soap Central article on Harvey

1960 births
Living people
American male film actors
American male television actors
American male voice actors
Male actors from Michigan
People from St. Clair Shores, Michigan
University of Michigan College of Literature, Science, and the Arts alumni
Yale School of Drama alumni
20th-century American male actors